David Yow (born August 2, 1960) is an American musician and actor born in Las Vegas, Nevada and best known as the vocalist for the noise rock bands Scratch Acid and the Jesus Lizard. Yow's debut solo album, Tonight You Look Like a Spider, was released in June 2013 on Joyful Noise Records.

Biography
In 1982, Yow formed the Austin, Texas–based punk/noise rock group Scratch Acid.  The group's initial lineup featured Steve Anderson (vocals), David Wm. Sims (guitar), Brett Bradford (guitar), Yow (bass), and Rey Washam (drums). Anderson was kicked out of the band early in their career, prompting Yow to move to vocals and Sims to move to bass. After releasing three albums and developing a strong following, the group disbanded in 1987.

Yow and Sims next formed the Jesus Lizard in 1987 with guitarist Duane Denison.  The trio relocated to Chicago, Illinois, in 1989.  They used a drum machine for their earliest recordings and performances before adding drummer Mac McNeilly after recording their first EP Pure. Yow achieved wide notoriety for playing shows completely drunk and incoherent. Of touring with Jesus Lizard, Yow said: "I enjoyed writing songs and acting like an idiot with those guys to make enough money to support ourselves." The Jesus Lizard eventually landed a spot on the Lollapalooza tour and signed to Capitol Records, despite earning little commercial success. During the course of their career, the Jesus Lizard released six studio albums, three EPs and a live album before breaking up in 1999.

In 1995, Yow collaborated with Helmet on a cover version of "Custard Pie" for Encomium: A Tribute to Led Zeppelin.

In 2006, Yow, Sims, Washam and Bradford reformed Scratch Acid for the Touch and Go Records 25th Anniversary Festival in Chicago. They also performed a series of reunion shows in Austin, Chicago, and Seattle.

In late 2006, Yow officially joined the two-piece Los Angeles band Qui as a full-time member, after playing several shows as a "special guest." Of his two bandmates, Yow said: "Well, they're both just fucking brilliant, y'know? I have never in all my years in the music industry encountered two guys with more talent, more vision ... and who are as driven to greatness as these two are." On January 25, 2008, Yow was hospitalized in Pittsburgh with a collapsed lung, following a Wrekmeister Harmonies performance at the Andy Warhol Museum. He was released from hospital a few days later.

In 2008, the Jesus Lizard reformed with the classic lineup and embarked on several tours.  They again lapsed into inactivity at the end of the following year.

In 2015, Yow performed two shows with Flipper, substituting for vocalist Bruce Loose who had to retire from live performance due to health issues. Yow reprised his role with Flipper for the band's 40th Anniversary Tour in 2019, with the shows being openly billed as Flipper with David Yow. 

Yow has also appeared live with other bands, including Cop Shoot Cop, Shellac, the Dicks, the Melvins, Girls Against Boys and has contributed vocals to various albums and recordings by Helmet, Pigface, and others.

Yow has appeared in two music videos for punk supergroup OFF!, 2014's "Hypnotized" (as a Hollywood street performer) and 2021's "Holier Than Thou" (as a corrupt Catholic priest).

According to his close friend and recording engineer Steve Albini, Yow is an accomplished cook and has worked in several restaurants in Austin and Chicago. Yow also has an extensive resume of graphic design work. He is known in his field for retouching photographs and is a former employee of Upshot, an advertising agency. Yow also recorded a commentary track for Tool's DVD single "Schism" in 2005. He appears as an actor in a few movies, including I Don't Feel at Home in This World Anymore, Southbound, Entertainment, Dinner in America, Under the Silver Lake and Big Money Rustlas, with Insane Clown Posse.

His first New York solo art show opened at Fuse Gallery on August 2011 and ran until September 21, 2011.

In 2013, Yow released a solo album that had been in production for almost 15 years on Joyful Noise Recordings.  The album—titled Tonight You Look Like a Spider—was released in a limited edition, where the vinyl album was delivered inside of a concrete monolith, instead of a normal record sleeve.  Yow stated that he'd been inspired to do the album by Mike Patton, and described his compositional process in an amusing anecdote:

"I rented a saxophone for 2 months, I borrowed some guitars and some drums, I rummaged through the kitchen, I squeezed a fat cat, I poked and prodded and ended up with my very own music. It’s real good, if you like that kind of shit. I named it Tonight You Look Like A Spider after a spider I saw one night."

Yow is an avid cat lover and has drawn cats for the last 30 years. In 2014, Akashic Books released a compilation of Yow's cat illustrations called Copycat: And a Litter of Other Cats. Yow also exclusively interviewed Lil Bub for The A.V. Club.

Discography

Studio albums
Tonight You Look Like a Spider (2013, Joyful Noise)

Filmography

Film

References

External links

2007 interview (with Qui) on MarkPrindle.com
David Yow questionnaire October 2007
Pitchfork article
Village Voice article 

Living people
American rock singers
American male singers
Post-hardcore musicians
Noise rock musicians
Pigface members
1960 births
Musicians from Las Vegas
American rock bass guitarists
American male bass guitarists
The Jesus Lizard members
Scratch Acid members
Flipper (band) members
20th-century American bass guitarists
Joyful Noise Recordings artists
20th-century American male musicians